SET domain containing protein 1A (SETD1A) is a protein that serves as a component of a histone methyltransferase (HMT) complex that produces mono-, di-, and trimethylated histone H3 at the lys4 residue (K4). SETD1A is highly homologous with SETDB1 but has a distinct subnuclear distribution.

Clinical significance 

Mutations of the SETD1A gene can cause neurodevelopmental disorder with speech impairment and dysmorphic facies (NEDSID) discovered in 2021, and early-onset epilepsy with or without developmental delay, first described in 2019.

According to a review published in 2018, mutations of the SETD1A gene may increase the risk of schizophrenia, based on studies available up to that date.

History 
The protein was first described in human in 2003 by Wysocka et al.

See also 
 SETDB1 - highly homologous to SETD1A
 SET domain

References 

Genes on human chromosome 16